Visa requirements for Swedish citizens are administrative entry restrictions by the authorities of other states placed on citizens of Sweden. As of 11 January 2022, Swedish citizens had visa-free or visa on arrival access to 188 countries and territories, ranking the Swedish passport 4th in the world in terms of travel freedom (tied with Austria, Denmark, France and the Netherlands) according to the Henley Passport Index.

As a member state of the European Union, Swedish citizens enjoy freedom of movement within the European Economic Area (EEA). The Citizens’ Rights Directive defines the right of free movement for citizens of the EEA. Through bilateral agreements freedom of movement is extended to Switzerland, and all EU and EFTA nationals are not only visa-exempt but are legally entitled to enter and reside in each other's countries.

In order to travel to another country, a Swedish citizen requires a passport, except within the Nordic Passport Union, where no identity card is formally required. A passport is also not required for holders of the Swedish national identity card for travel to European countries (except Belarus, Russia, Ukraine and United Kingdom), Dominica, French overseas territories, Georgia, Montserrat and Tunisia.

Visa requirements map

Visa requirements

Dependent, Disputed, or Restricted territories
Visa requirements for Swedish citizens for visits to various territories, disputed areas, partially recognized countries, and restricted zones:

Europe
 — Visa required. ID card de facto valid
 — Visa required (issued for single entry for 21 days/1/2/3 months or multiple entry visa for 1/2/3 months).Travellers with Artsakh visa (expired or valid) or evidence of travel to Artsakh (stamps) will be permanently denied entry to Azerbaijan.
 Mount Athos — Special permit required (4 days: 25 euro for Orthodox visitors, 35 euro for non-Orthodox visitors, 18 euro for students). There is a visitors' quota: maximum 100 Orthodox and 10 non-Orthodox per day and women are not allowed.
 Brest and Grodno — Visa not required for 10 days.
 Crimea — Visa issued by Russia is required.
 — Visa free access for 3 months. ID Card valid.
 UN Buffer Zone in Cyprus — Access Permit is required for travelling inside the zone, except Civil Use Areas.
 — Visa not required. ID Card valid.
 Jan Mayen — permit issued by the local police required for staying for less than 24 hours and permit issued by the Norwegian police for staying for more than 24 hours.
 — From 1 July 2019, Swedish citizens are eligible for E-visa access for 8 days.
 — visa free for 90 days. ID Card valid 
 — Visa free. Multiple entry visa to Russia and three-day prior notification are required to enter South Ossetia.
 — Visa free. ID card valid. Registration required after 24h.

Africa
 — special permit required.
  (outside Asmara) — visa covers Asmara only; to travel in the rest of the country, a Travel Permit for Foreigners is required (20 Eritrean nakfa).

 — eVisa for 3 months within any year period.
 — Visitor's Pass granted on arrival valid for 4/10/21/60/90 days for 12/14/16/20/25 pound sterling.
 — Permission to land required for 15/30 pounds sterling (yacht/ship passenger) for Tristan da Cunha Island or 20 pounds sterling for Gough Island, Inaccessible Island or Nightingale Islands.
 (Western Sahara controlled territory) — undefined visa regime.
 — visa required (30 days for 30 US dollars, payable on arrival).

Asia
 Hainan — Visa on arrival for 15 days. Available at Haikou Meilan International Airport and Sanya Phoenix International Airport.Visa not required for 15 days for traveling as part of a tourist group (5 or more people)
 — Visa not required for 90 days.
 — Protected Area Permit (PAP) required for whole states of Nagaland and Sikkim and parts of states Manipur, Arunachal Pradesh, Uttaranchal, Jammu and Kashmir, Rajasthan, Himachal Pradesh. Restricted Area Permit (RAP) required for all of Andaman and Nicobar Islands and parts of Sikkim. Some of these requirements are occasionally lifted for a year.
 — Visa not required for 90 days.
 outside Pyongyang – People are not allowed to leave the capital city, tourists can only leave the capital with a governmental tourist guide (no independent moving)
 — Visa not required. Arrival by sea to Gaza Strip not allowed.
 — Visa not required for 90 days.
 Gorno-Badakhshan Autonomous Province — OIVR permit required (15+5 Tajikistani Somoni) and another special permit (free of charge) is required for Lake Sarez.
 Tibet Autonomous Region — Tibet Travel Permit required (10 US Dollars).
 — A special permit, issued prior to arrival by Ministry of Foreign Affairs, is required if visiting the following places: Atamurat, Cheleken, Dashoguz, Serakhs and Serhetabat.
 Korean Demilitarized Zone — restricted zone.
 UNDOF Zone and Ghajar — restricted zones.

Caribbean and North Atlantic
 — Visa not required for 3 months.
 — Visa not required for 30 days.
 — Visa not required.
 Bonaire, St. Eustatius and Saba — Visa not required for 3 months.
 — Visa not required.
 — Visa not required for 6 months.
 — Visitors arriving at San Andrés and Leticia must buy tourist cards on arrival.
 — Visa not required for 3 months.
 — Visa not required for 6 months. ID card valid if in transit to a third country if staying for max 14 days 
 — Visa not required under the Visa Waiver Program, for 90 days on arrival from overseas for 2 years. ESTA required.
 — Visa not required for 3 months. ID Card valid if arriving at L'Espérance Airport in the French part of the island
 — Visa not required for 90 days.
 — Visa not required under the Visa Waiver Program, for 90 days on arrival from overseas for 2 years. ESTA required.

Oceania
 — Electronic authorization for 30 days.
 Ashmore and Cartier Islands — special authorisation required.
 Clipperton Island — special permit required.
 — Visa free access for 31 days.
 — Visa not required under the Visa Waiver Program, for 90 days on arrival from overseas for 2 years. ESTA required.
 — Visa on arrival valid for 30 days is issued free of charge.
 — 14 days visa free and landing fee US$35 or tax of US$5 if not going ashore.
 — Entry permit required.
 United States Minor Outlying Islands — special permits required for Baker Island, Howland Island, Jarvis Island, Johnston Atoll, Kingman Reef, Midway Atoll, Palmyra Atoll and Wake Island.

South Atlantic and Antarctica
 — Visitor Permit valid for 4 weeks is issued on arrival.
 — Pre-arrival permit from the Commissioner required (72 hours/1 month for 110/160 pounds sterling).

Non-ordinary passports
Holders of Swedish diplomatic passports have additional visa-free access to Russia. Holders of diplomatic or service passports of any country have visa-free access to Cape Verde, Ethiopia, Mali and Zimbabwe.

Non-visa restrictions

Vaccination
Many African countries, including Angola, Benin, Burkina Faso, Cameroon, Central African Republic, Chad, Democratic Republic of the Congo, Republic of the Congo, Côte d'Ivoire, Equatorial Guinea, Gabon, Ghana, Guinea, Liberia, Mali, Mauritania, Niger, Rwanda, São Tomé and Príncipe, Senegal, Sierra Leone, Uganda, Zambia require all incoming passengers to have a current International Certificate of Vaccination. Some other countries require vaccination only if the passenger is coming from an infected area.

Right to consular protection in non-EU countries

When in a non-EU country where there is no Swedish embassy, Swedish citizens as EU citizens have the right to get consular protection from the embassy of any other EU country present in that country.

Swedish citizens may also seek assistance from public officials in the foreign services of any of the Nordic countries, when in a country with no Swedish representation. This is afforded by the Helsinki Treaty which states that public officials in the foreign services of any of the Nordic countries shall assist citizens of another Nordic country if that country is not represented in the territory concerned.

See also 

 Swedish nationality law
 Swedish passport
 Visa requirements for European Union citizens
 Visa policy of the Schengen Area

References and Notes
References

Notes

Sweden
Foreign relations of Sweden